Frantz Benjamin is a Canadian politician, who was elected to the National Assembly of Quebec in the 2018 provincial election. He represents the electoral district of Viau as a member of the Quebec Liberal Party.

Benjamin formerly served as a member of Montreal City Council and the chairman of the city council, representing the district of Saint-Michel in the borough of Villeray–Saint-Michel–Parc-Extension. Formerly associated with the Union Montreal political party, he resigned on October 30, 2012 in protest against the allegations of corruption surrounding mayor Gérald Tremblay at the Charbonneau commission hearings. He sat as an independent councillor until June 2013, when he reaffiliated with the new Équipe Denis Coderre.

References

Living people
Montreal city councillors
Black Canadian politicians
Year of birth missing (living people)
People from Villeray–Saint-Michel–Parc-Extension
Canadian people of Haitian descent
Haitian Quebecers
21st-century Canadian politicians
Quebec Liberal Party MNAs